Iván Salvador Edú (born 11 December 1995), known in Spain as Iban Salvador and in Africa as Iban Edú, is a professional footballer who plays as a forward for Primera Federación club CF Fuenlabrada. Born in Spain, he represents the Equatorial Guinea national team.

Salvador began his career at Hospitalet, and after his first season was signed by Valencia. A full international for Equatorial Guinea since 2015, he was part of their squad which came fourth at that year's Africa Cup of Nations.

Club career
Born in L'Hospitalet de Llobregat, Barcelona, Catalonia, Salvador joined hometown club CE L'Hospitalet's youth setup in 2002, aged six. He made his senior debut on 27 October 2013, coming on as a second-half substitute for Enrique Carreño in a 3–2 home win against Villarreal CF B in the Segunda División B championship.

Salvador scored his first goal on 10 November, netting the last in a 5–0 away routing over AE Prat. He finished the campaign with 26 appearances and five goals, as his side missed out on promotion in the play-offs.

On 4 August 2014 Salvador joined Valencia CF, being assigned to the reserves also in the third level. On 20 July 2016, he signed a three-year contract with Segunda División side Real Valladolid, with Valencia retaining a buy-back clause.

Salvador made his professional debut on 21 August 2016, starting in a 1–0 Segunda División home win against Real Oviedo. He scored his first goal in the category on 2 October, netting his team's second in a 2–3 away loss against Levante UD.

On 25 January 2017, Salvador was loaned to fellow second tier club UCAM Murcia CF until the end of the season. On 10 July 2018, after a six-month loan deal at Cultural y Deportiva Leonesa, he moved to Celta de Vigo B in the third division after agreeing to a three-year contract.

On 5 July 2019, Salvador signed a two-year deal with CF Fuenlabrada, newly promoted to the second division.

International career
Ibán's maternal grandfather was born in the then Spanish Guinea and arrived in Catalonia in the 1960s along with his Galician wife,<ref>{{cite web|url=http://www.lesportiudecatalunya.cat/nel9/article/8-esports/51-futbol-internacional/813242-de-bellvitge-a-llnzalang.html|title=De Bellvitge a lnzalang'|trans-title=From Bellvitge to the `Nzalang´|publisher=L'Esportiu|language=ca|date=16 January 2015|access-date=17 January 2015}}</ref> making him eligible to both Equatorial Guinea and Spain.

On 7 January 2015, Ibán made his full international debut for Equatorial Guinea, starting in a 1–1 friendly draw against Cape Verde. A day later, he was included in Esteban Becker's 23-man list for the 2015 Africa Cup of Nations held in the country, and made his debut in the competition on the 17th, starting in a 1–1 draw against Congo.

Ibán scored his first goal for Equatorial Guinea in a 2–0 defeat of Gabon, which put the nation into the quarter-finals of the Africa Cup of Nations for the second time in its history, eventually finishing in fourth place.

Career statistics

International

International goalsScore and Result shows Equatorial Guinea's goal tally first''

References

External links

1995 births
Living people
Citizens of Equatorial Guinea through descent
Equatoguinean footballers
Association football forwards
Equatorial Guinea international footballers
2015 Africa Cup of Nations players
Equatoguinean sportspeople of Spanish descent
Equatoguinean people of Catalan descent
People of Galician descent
Spanish footballers
Footballers from L'Hospitalet de Llobregat
Spanish sportspeople of Equatoguinean descent
Spanish people of Galician descent
Segunda División players
Segunda División B players
CE L'Hospitalet players
Valencia CF Mestalla footballers
Real Valladolid players
UCAM Murcia CF players
Cultural Leonesa footballers
Celta de Vigo B players
CF Fuenlabrada footballers
2021 Africa Cup of Nations players